Geny Cipriano Catamo (born 26 January 2001) is a Mozambican professional footballer who plays as a winger for Primeira Liga club Marítimo on loan from 

Sporting CP  He also plays for the Mozambique national team.

Club career
On 11 June 2019, Catamo signed a professional contract with the youth academy of Sporting for 2 years. He made his first bench for the first team in September 2021 against Porto, wearing jersey number 57.

International career
Catamo represented the Mozambique U20 in December 2018, scoring on his debut in the 2018 COSAFA U-20 Cup. He had previously played in the 2017 COSAFA Under-17 Championship.

Catamo debuted with the senior Mozambique national football team in a 2-0 win over Mauritius on 10 September 2019, again scoring in his debut.
In October 2021 he scored in a world cup qualifier with his goal being Mozambique's only goal in a 3–1 loss to Cameroon.

International goals
Scores and results list Mozambique's goal tally first.

References

External links
 ZeroZero Profile
 
 Sporting Profile

2001 births
Living people
Mozambican footballers
Mozambique international footballers
Mozambique under-20 international footballers
Mozambique youth international footballers
Sporting CP footballers
Vitória S.C. players
Campeonato de Portugal (league) players
Primeira Liga players
Association football wingers
Mozambican expatriate footballers
Mozambican expatriate sportspeople in Portugal
Expatriate footballers in Portugal